Statistics of the First League of Bosnia and Herzegovina in the 1994–95 season.

Overview
It was contested by 22 teams, divided in 3 groups with 6 teams, while the last group consisted of 4 teams. After the group stage, the best 2 teams from each group would go to a preliminary knockout playoff round. The 4 winners of those matches were once again grouped in a single group, and the team which placed first in that group would be declared as the overall winner of that session. The winner in the end was NK Čelik Zenica.

This was the first and only time that the league was played in this format.

First round

Group Sarajevo

Group Jablanica

Group Tuzla

Group Zenica

Play-off
 Played in Zenica.

Preliminary round 
Played on 4 and 5 August 1994.

Final

References
Bosnia-Herzegovina - List of final tables (RSSSF)
SportSport.ba forum

First League of Bosnia and Herzegovina seasons
1994–95 in Bosnia and Herzegovina football
Bosnia